Voices Music & Entertainment is a record label based in Oslo, Norway established in  1988 by Ketil Sveen and Dag Krogsvold. In the first years the company was a label focusing on signing and developing Norwegian rock acts. Since then the company has expanded rapidly, and business areas now also include distribution and publishing evolving from Voices of Wonder in 2001.

In 1996 Voices of Wonder also founded a fully owned subsidiary in Denmark bringing in Tom Jensen as partner in the company.

VM&E (VME) operates in a diverse range of music genres from dance to black metal, runs a number of sublabels and distributes records of foreign labels.

Sublabels
 Beatservice
 Bad Afro Records
 DJ Beat Records Scandinavia
 Euphonious Records
 Jester Records
 Music for Dreams
 Head Not Found
 Voices of Wonder

References

External links
 Official site

IFPI members
Norwegian record labels
Record labels established in 1988
1988 establishments in Norway
Companies based in Oslo
Music in Oslo